The non-marine molluscs of Benin are a part of the molluscan fauna of Benin (wildlife of Benin).

A number of species of non-marine molluscs are found in the wild in Benin.

Freshwater gastropods 
Planorbidae
 Africanogyrus coretus (de Blainville, 1826)
 Biomphalaria camerunensis (C. R. Boettger, 1941)
 Bulinus forskalii (Ehrenberg, 1831)
 Bulinus globosus (Morelet, 1866)
 Bulinus senegalensis 	Müller, 1781
 Gyraulus costulatus (Krauss, 1848)
 Segmentorbis kanisaensis (Preston, 1914)

Paludomidae
 Cleopatra bulimoides 	(Olivier, 1804)

Thiaridae
 Pachymelania aurita (Müller, 1774)
 Pachymelania byronensis (Wood, 1828)
 Pachymelania fusca (Gmelin, 1791)

Pachychilidae
 Potadoma freethi (Gray, 1831)
 Potadoma moerchi (Reeve, 1859)

Potamididae
 Tympanotonos fuscatus (Linnaeus, 1758) – in brackish water

Ampullariidae
 Lanistes libycus (Morelet, 1848)

Hydrobiidae
 Hydrobia lineata Binder, 1957
 Potamopyrgus ciliatus (Gould, 1850)

Neritidae
 Neritina oweniana (Wood, 1828)
 Neritina rubricata Morelet, 1858

Lymnaeidae
 Radix natalensis (Krauss, 1848)

Land gastropods 
Land gastropods in Cameroon include:

Freshwater bivalves

See also
 List of marine molluscs of Benin

Lists of molluscs of surrounding countries:
 List of non-marine molluscs of Togo, Wildlife of Togo
 List of non-marine molluscs of Nigeria, Wildlife of Nigeria
 List of non-marine molluscs of Burkina Faso, Wildlife of Burkina Faso
 List of non-marine molluscs of Niger, Wildlife of Niger

References

Molluscs, Non marine

Moll
Benin
Benin